The Paradise of Death is a 5-part BBC radio drama, based on the long-running British science fiction television series Doctor Who, and starring Jon Pertwee as the Doctor.

Production and broadcast history
This was the second radio serial made by the BBC based on the Doctor Who television series. In 1985, the Sixth Doctor, played by Colin Baker, had starred in a 6-part radio serial entitled Slipback, during the hiatus between seasons whilst he was starring as the Doctor on television. Prior to this, there was also an audio drama made in 1976 called Doctor Who and the Pescatons, starring Tom Baker and Elisabeth Sladen.

The scriptwriter for Paradise of Death, Barry Letts, was a former BBC Producer and Director who had (amongst his other credits) produced Doctor Who on television from 1969 to 1974 (in other words, for almost the entire time Jon Pertwee had played the Third Doctor). Letts had also co-written (together with playwright Robert Sloman) several of the Doctor Who television serials in which Pertwee had appeared, and had gone on later in the 1970s to novelise some of the television serials he had produced, which were published in hardback and paperback by WH Allen. He would also novelise his own scripts for this radio serial, for publication by WH Allen in 1994.

Because of Letts' familiarity with the Doctor Who series from the five years that he had produced the show, it was an obvious decision that his script would feature that period: namely Pertwee's Doctor, and some of the regulars (in the event, the Brigadier and Sarah Jane) whom Pertwee knew from his time on the show. In effect, this radio production was a reunion of the main cast who had worked on Pertwee's final season on television in 1973–74.

The serial The Paradise of Death was first broadcast in five episodes on BBC Radio 5 (a station which, at the time, was heard solely on AM in the UK) from 27 August to 24 September 1993. It was subsequently repeated, between 12 April and 10 May 1994, by BBC Radio 2 on FM.

The serial was released as part of the BBC Radio Collection on audio-cassette (ZBBC 1494), and in March 2000 was re-released on double CD. The Radio Collection releases included several "bonus" scenes which (due to some scripts proving too long for the 29 minute timeslot) had not been included in the radio broadcasts.

During the repeat of the serial on Radio 2, by mistake the episodes were aired out of order. This error generated so many complaints to the BBC's Duty Office that the Corporation realised they had under-estimated the size of the listening audience, a realisation which led them to decide to commission a sequel.

Accordingly, a second radio serial featuring the Third Doctor, The Ghosts of N-Space, was broadcast on Radio 2 in 1996. More might have followed, but Pertwee died in 1996, bringing the Third Doctor's era to a close. Letts was thereupon commissioned, instead, to develop an idea for a radio play based upon the 1970s BBC science fiction series Blake's 7, which would ultimately lead to his writing two productions featuring cast members from that show, which were broadcast in 1998.

Synopsis
Brigadier Lethbridge-Stewart of UNIT asks the Doctor to investigate a particularly gruesome murder at a new theme park on London's Hampstead Heath, called Space World. Together with journalist Sarah Jane Smith and her photographer Jeremy Fitzoliver, they take in the incongruous exhibits, including virtual reality machines, and even seemingly living alien monstrosities – which the Brigadier immediately suspects of the killing.

The owners of the theme park are a gang of alien carpetbaggers from outer space, who are ostensibly trying to persuade the Government to begin talks on allowing interplanetary trade. Although their real motives are unclear, they have a sophisticated form of mind-control which they employ to kill anyone who threatens their plans.

When Sarah is kidnapped by the sinister Mr Tragan, and transported to the aliens' home planet, Parakon, the Doctor and the Brigadier must race to her rescue in the Tardis. On Parakon, they learn the truth about the proposed trade deal, which will mean the destruction of all life on Earth. The rapine plant is a parasite which will turn the planet into a wasteland.

Freeth and Tragan are secretly conspiring to overthrow the President and democratic government on Parakon, and fear what the visitors from Earth may accidentally disclose which might reveal their plans to Captain Rudley, the commander of the Presidential Guard. The Doctor hopes to persuade the President that rapine will harm the Earth, but Freeth and Tragan hope to have the Doctor executed before he can do so.

On their first broadcast, the episodes were summarised as follows –

1: The Doctor is called in to investigate a murder at Space World.

2: The Doctor is dead, and the Brigadier discovers that the Parakon Corporation has friends in high places.

3: Can the Tardis escape from war-torn Blestinu in time to save Sarah Jane from Tragan?

4: Freeth holds the Doctor captive, while Captain Rudley is to be executed for treason.

5: The Gargan monster has Sarah and Jeremy cornered in its den.

Cast
The Doctor — Jon Pertwee
Brigadier Lethbridge-Stewart — Nicholas Courtney
Sarah Jane Smith — Elisabeth Sladen
Jeremy Fitzoliver — Richard Pearce
Chairman Freeth — Harold Innocent
Vice-Chairman Tragan — Peter Miles
President of Parakon — Maurice Denham
Onya Farjin — Jane Slavin
Grebber/Reporter — Brian Hall
Clorinda/Secretary General of the UN — Jillie Meers
General Commanding Unit — John Hardwood
Odun/Patrol Leader — John Fleming
Captain Waldo Rudley — Jonathan Tafler
Greckle — Emma Myant
Rasco Heldal — Michael Onslow
Medan/Hunter — David Holt
Yallett/Officer of the day — Philip Anthony
Crestin/Bill/Radio Voice/Ambulance Man/Man – Andrew Wincott
Nobby/Kitson/Wilkins/Soldier – Dominic Letts
Echo Location Operator/Lexhan – Julian Rhind-Tutt
Kaido/Guard 2/Ungar/Custodian of Data Store/Jenhegger – Trevor Martin

Continuity
The liner notes from the CD release state that this adventure fits "seamlessly into television continuity between The Time Warrior and Invasion of the Dinosaurs". 
Throughout the serial, the theme music used to commence and conclude each episode is not the third version of Delia Derbyshire's theme tune that was used during nearly all of Jon Pertwee's time on the television series and nearly exclusively throughout the 1970s. The music used is, anachronistically, the Peter Howell version of the theme tune that was used on the TV series for Seasons 18-22 (August 1980 - March 1985)
The opening scene, featuring an alien spacecraft landing on Hamstead Heath, is lifted from a story outline submitted to the Who production office in 1970, by Bob Baker and Dave Martin, for the serial which ultimately aired as The Claws of Axos.
Episode 1 explicitly sets out to establish that the serial is taking place during the 1973–74 season on television, shortly after Sarah's first appearance in the show. The Doctor tells her about his visit to ancient Atlantis in The Time Monster the previous year, and they discuss events they experienced together, in Sarah's first story The Time Warrior (set in the merrie England of the 13th Century). The Radio Collection release includes a lot of additional detail, in a "bonus" scene.
The Doctor's pointed remark, universally, to Freeth and Tragan in Episode 1, which the Brigadier echoes in the following scene, is a reference to a line of dialogue spoken by Roger Delgado in Terror of the Autons (1971).
The alien mind-control helmets in Episode 1, used to force Mr Grebber to commit "suicide", are based on the mind control helmets used by the B.O.S.S. computer in The Green Death (1973) – a serial co-written by Barry Letts. Most of the plot devices which are re-used in this serial, detailed in this section, originally featured in televised Doctor Who episodes which Letts himself had written.
In Episode 2 the Doctor's being presumed dead, until examined by a medical doctor, is based on a similar scene in The Daemons (1971), and Sarah presuming him to be dead (and crying over his body) is borrowed from Planet of the Spiders (1974) – both serials which were very familiar to Barry Letts, as he co-wrote both of them (with Bob Sloman).
The discussion about the United Nations treaty (over the meaning of the host country clause), in Episode 2, are a reference to the Brigadier's argument concerning that clause with the Minister of Ecology in The Green Death – another serial co-written by Barry Letts.
The numerous mentions in Episode 2 of Bessie, the Doctor's vintage motorcar, refer to the little yellow Edwardian roadster which the Doctor drove in various serials between Doctor Who and the Silurians (1970) and The Five Doctors (1983).
The mention of the Blinovitch limitation effect in Episode 2 is a reference to a discussion on time travel between Jon Pertwee and Katy Manning in Day of the Daleks (1972).
The Brigadier's line, Reverse the polarity of the neutron flow, in Episode 3, is a joking reference to the many times Pertwee used that phrase (or some variant of it) on television, including in The Sea Devils and The Five Doctors (where he used that exact phrase), and in Doctor Who and the Silurians, Terror of the Autons, The Daemons, The Time Monster, Frontier in Space and Planet of the Daleks (where he used a close variant of it).
The Doctor tries, unsuccessfully, to soothe an alien monster by crooning a Venusian Lullaby, in Episode 5, as he had successfully done with the monster Aggador in The Curse of Peladon and The Monster of Peladon.
The revelation in Episode 5 that the Rapine plant – which the Parakon Corporation intends to harvest on Earth – will bring about the destruction of all life on the planet is lifted from The Claws of Axos: the details of the process differ, but the essence of the aliens' plan is the same as the Axons' nutrition cycle (for rapine read axonite).
Jenhegger's line when he saves the Doctor's life, No you shall not, he is a good man, in Episode 5, is based on a similar scene in the final episode of The Daemons (1971), where Jo Grant begs the alien, Azal, not to slay the Doctor (No! No, he's a good man! Kill me, not him!) – another of the serials co-written by Barry Letts.
Jeremy Fitzoliver returns in the next audio serial, The Ghosts of N-Space.

Cast and crew notes
Writer Barry Letts was a long time writer, director and producer for Doctor Who, particularly during Jon Pertwee's years. He returned as the scriptwriter of the next radio play, Jon Pertwee's last performance as the Doctor, The Ghosts of N-Space.
Harold Innocent had previously portrayed Gilbert M in the Doctor Who television serial The Happiness Patrol in 1987, and died between the first broadcast of episodes 3 and 4 of this serial.
Peter Miles has portrayed several roles in Doctor Who, including Nyder in Genesis of the Daleks.
Maurice Denham previously portrayed Azmael in the Doctor Who television serial The Twin Dilemma.
Dominic Letts is the son of scriptwriter Barry Letts.
Trevor Martin previously portrayed a Time Lord in the serial The War Games and the Doctor himself in the stage play Doctor Who and the Daleks in the Seven Keys to Doomsday.  He reprised this latter role in the Big Finish Productions audio adaptation The Seven Keys to Doomsday.
Jane Slavin went on to appear in several Doctor Who audio plays for Big Finish Productions starring Tom Baker's Fourth Doctor.

Reception 
In 1994, Science Fiction Chronicles Don D'Ammassa reviewed the novelisation as "Unlike most of the recent original novels, this has much more of the feel of the series, perhaps because Letts also wrote several original scripts."

In print

The Paradise of Death was novelised by Barry Letts for WH Allen's Target Books imprint, and published in 1994; it was the 156th and final novelisation to be published by Target, ending a series of books which began in 1964 (and had been published under the Target label since 1973).

The subsequent serial, The Ghosts of N-Space, would be novelised as part of the Virgin Missing Adventures series.

References

Target novelisation

Third Doctor audio plays
Radio plays based on Doctor Who
1993 audio plays
1993 radio dramas
UNIT audio plays
BBC Radio 2 programmes
BBC Radio dramas